Metropolitan John (secular name Georgy Yevgenyevich Roshchin, ; 22 October 1974, Moscow) is a retired Metropolitan of the Russian Orthodox Church.  

During 2014-2018 he served as the US-based titular bishop , vicar of the Patriarch of Moscow and all Russia. Metropolitan John is also the former administrator of the Patriarchal Parishes in the USA.

Biography

Early life 
In 1991, he graduated from Secondary School №4 in Moscow with depth study of English Language.

In 1991-1993, he studied at the Faculty of Law of the Sholokhov Moscow State University for Humanities with a specialization. During the same period, he served as an altar boy of the Church of the Life-Giving Trinity on Sparrow Hills.

During 1993-1994, he held obediences at the Pskov-Caves Monastery.

From 1994-1997, he studied at the Moscow Theological Seminary. During the seminary training he served guide of the Church archaeological cabinet at the Moscow Theological Academy and Seminary.

In 1996-1997, he worked as a staff member of the Publishing Council of the Russian Orthodox Church specializing in drafting liturgical guidelines.

In 1997, he was appointed the Secretariat for Inter-Christian Relations of the Moscow Patriarchate’s Synodal Department for External Church Affairs.

In December 1998, he was a member of the Moscow Patriarchate's delegation at the Eighth Assembly of the World Council of Churches (Harare, Zimbabwe) and was elected to the WCC Central Committee.

During 1999-2000, he studied at Saint Vladimir's Orthodox Theological Seminary in Crestwood, New York. In 2000-2002, he studied at the Faculty of Philosophy at the Catholic University of America in Washington, DC.

From 2003 to 2009, as a member of the Secretariate on Church and Society of the Synodal Department for External Church Relations, he was in charge of inter-religious communication, including interaction with the Interreligious Council of Russia and the SNG Interreligious Council, and international interfaith organizations, was a member of the Commission of the Conference of European Churches "Islam in Europe", participated in the preparation and conduct of the Fourth, Fifth, and Sixth Meetings of the joint Russian-Iranian commission "Islam-Christianity".

Ordination 
On August 28, 2007, Metropolitan Kirill of Smolensk and Kaliningrad (the present Patriarch of Moscow and all Russia) ordained him a Deacon; on September 23, Kirill ordained him a priest.

On 27 July 2009, the Holy Synod appointed him Deputy Chairman of the Moscow Patriarchate Synodal Department for the Coordination of Church and Society.

In 2009, with the blessing of Patriarch Kirill of Moscow and all the Rus, he was a member of the Council for the Study of Religious Materials to identify extremist materials in the Ministry of Justice. He was the official representative of the Moscow Patriarchate in the Parliamentary Assembly of the Union of Belarus and Russia, a member of the Commission on organising state support and the development of original Cossack culture, a member of the Public Council under the Federal Drug Control Service, and a member of the Public Council under Rosreyestr.

From 2010 to 2013, he was the executive secretary of the Interreligious Council of the Commonwealth of Independent States.

On April 19, 2011 in the cathedral church of the Descent of the Holy Spirit of the stauropegial Conception Convent in Moscow, he was elevated to the rank of archpriest by the Patriarch Kirill of Moscow and All Russia.

On 4 October 2012, the Holy Synod appointed him representative of the World Russian People's Council at the UN and assigned him to St Nicholas Cathedral in New York City.

On 11 March 2014, with the blessing of Patriarch Kirill of Moscow and all Rus', the Superior of the Trinity Lavra of St. Sergius, Archbishop Theognost (Guzikov) of Sergiev Posad, tonsured him a monk with the name John in honour of St. John (Maximovitch) of Shanghai and San Francisco.

A Holy Synod decision, on 25 July 2014, appointed him as Administrator of the Patriarchal Parishes in the USA, and vicar bishop of the Diocese of Moscow with the title of bishop .

On July 28, 2014, Patriarch Kirill of Moscow and All Russia, at the Liturgy in the Cathedral of Christ the Savior, elevated him to the rank of archimandrite.

On August 1, 2014, in Church of George the Great Martyr at Poklonnaya Hill during the Divine Liturgy the Episcopal Consecration of Archimandrite John (Roshchin) as Bishop of Naro-Fominsk was performed by: Patriarch Kirill of Moscow and all Russia, Metropolitan Juvenaly (Poyarkov) of Krutisty and Kolomna, Metropolitan Hilarion (Alfeyev) of Volokolamsk, Archbishop Mark (Golovkov) of Yegorievsk, Bishop Sergius (Chashin) of Solnechnogorsk.

Primate of the Patriarchal Exarchate in Western Europe (PEWE) 

On 15 October 2018, the Holy Synod of the Russian Orthodox Church appointed him , in charge of the parishes of the Russian Orthodox Church in Italy.

"On 28 December 2018,the Holy Synod appointed him as the primate of the Western Europe Exarchate, with the title "of Chersonesus and Western Europe", he was also simultaneously appointed as the primate of the diocese of Chersonesus. He temporarily continue[d] to administer the parishes in Italy."

"January 3, 2019: Patriarch Kirill elevated him to the dignity of metropolitan at the Kremlin Dormition Cathedral in Moscow, during the Divine Liturgy for the feast of Saint Peter, Metropolitan of Moscow." Nestor (Sirotenko) [ru] was the previously the primate of the diocese of Chersonesus, but he was replaced by John (Roshchin) by the Holy Synod on 28 December 2018.

Metropolitan of Vienna and Budapest 
On 30 May 2019, the Holy Synod of the ROC decided to appoint archbishop Anthony (Sevryuk) of Vienna and Budapest as primate of the PEWE and of the diocese of Chersonesus. At the same time, John (Roshchin), who was until then the primate of the PEWE and of the diocese of Chersonesus, was appointed as primate of the ROC diocese of Vienna and Budapest to replace archbishop Anthony. In the same decision, Bishop  was appointed Bishop of Bogorodsk.

On August 30, 2019, by the decision of the Holy Synod of the ROC, he was released from the administration of the Diocese of Budapest and Hungaria with a change of title to "of Vienna and Austria".

On March 11, 2020, by the decision of the Holy Synod of the ROC, he was retired with his residence in Moscow.

References

External links 
Metropolitan Ioann to head Russian Orthodox in Europe // asianews.it, January 5, 2019

Bishops of the Russian Orthodox Church
Russian Orthodoxy in the United States
Eastern Orthodoxy in Austria
Eastern Orthodoxy in Hungary
21st-century Eastern Orthodox bishops
1974 births
Living people